

Small arms

Long arms

Side arms

Machine guns

Artillery

Warships

Battleships
Battleships

Cruisers 
Cruisers

Destroyers 
Destroyers

U-boats 
U-boats

Ironclads 
Ironclads

Ship of the line and frigates 
Ship of the Line and Frigates

Weapons of Austria-Hungary
Military history of Austria
Military history of Austria-Hungary